Vesterbro/Kongens Enghave is one of the 10 official districts of Copenhagen, Denmark. The district has an area of 8.22 km² and a population of  53,351.

See also
 Vesterbro
 Kongens Enghave

References

External links

 
Copenhagen city districts